Calcioscommesse (Italian: "soccer bet") may refer to:

 Totonero 1980, a scandal of association football matchfixing in Italy in 1980
 Totonero 1986, a scandal of association football matchfixing in Italy between 1984 and 1986
 The 2011–12 Italian football scandal
 The 2015 Italian football scandal

See also
 Totonero, the 1980s scandals
 Calciopoli, the 2006 Italian matchfixing scandal